The Jill & Tony Curtis Story is a 2008 feature-length documentary directed by Ian Ayres, is about Tony Curtis and his wife and their efforts  to rescue horses from slaughterhouses. A camera crew follows Jill and Tony Curtis as they take in horses that would have been inhumanely killed and sent overseas as food for humans. The DVD of the documentary includes bonus features concerning such topics as Tony Curtis the artist, how Tony met Jill, and their love of horses.

References

External links
The Jill & Tony Curtis Story at the Internet Movie Database
Documentary film, The Jill & Tony Curtis Story

2008 films
American documentary films
Documentary films about animal rights
2000s English-language films
2000s American films